Theodore Wynsdau (8 January 1895 – 1 September 1951) was a Belgian racing cyclist. He rode in the 1920 Tour de France.

References

1895 births
1951 deaths
Belgian male cyclists
Place of birth missing